Clan Kirkpatrick is a Lowland armigerous Scottish clan. There are several variations of the Kirkpatrick name: Kilpatric, Kilpatrick, and Gilpatrick. The names Kirkpatrick and Kilpatrick may have been interchangeable at one time. The clan is recognised by the Court of the Lord Lyon, however the clan does not currently have a chief so recognised. The surname Kirkpatrick is also a recognized sept of Clan Douglas and Clan Colquhoun.

History

Origins of the clan

Traditional origins
The clan takes its name from the church of Saint Patrick in the parish of Closeburn in Dumfriesshire, Scotland. Traditionally the Kirkpatrick family of Closeburn have held these lands since the ninth century.

Recorded origins

The family first appear on record in the twelfth century when Ivone de Kirkpatrick witnessed a charter of the Clan Bruce. Ivone also received a charter of confirmation for all of his lands that was granted to him by Alexander II of Scotland.

Wars of Scottish Independence

Roger Kirkpatrick was an attendant of Robert the Bruce when he killed John "the Red" Comyn, chief of Clan Comyn in the church at Dumfries. It is said that Kirkpatrick met the Bruce rushing out of the church exclaiming that he thought he had killed Comyn and that Kirkpatrick then drew his dagger with the words, I mak sikkar; meaning “I make sure”; the clan motto and chief's coat of arms allude to this story. Kirkpatrick was sent on an embassy in 1314 with Sir Neil Campbell of Clan Campbell into England and in recompense the Kirkpatrick family received the lands of Redburgh. Sir Roger Kirkpatrick distinguished himself in 1355 when he took both Caerlaverock Castle and Dalswinton Castle from the English. In 1357 Kirkpatrick was murdered by his kinsman, Sir James Lindsay of Clan Lindsay in a private quarrel. The title then passed through a nephew to Sir Thomas Kirkpatrick, who in 1409 received from Robert Stewart, Duke of Albany the baronies of Closeburn and Redburgh.

16th and 17th centuries

In 1526 a feud arose with the Clan Charteris. It is recorded in Pitcairn's Criminal Trials of Scotland that John Charteris of Amisfield, along with his brother and two sons, were charged with the murder of Roger Kilpatrick, son of Alexander Kilpatrick in March 1526.

In 1542 Sir Thomas Kirkpatrick's grandson, another Sir Thomas Kirkpatrick, was taken prisoner at the Battle of Solway Moss. The estate then passed through a cousin and in 1685 Sir Thomas Kirkpatrick of Closeburn was created a Baronet of Nova Scotia for his support of Charles I of England. The mansion house that was built by the 1st Baronet burned down in a fire. The 4th Baronet, Sir James sold the Closeburn estates.

In 1563 John Carruthers of Howmains, of Clan Carruthers was indicted, along with Edward Irvine of Bonshaw (chief of Clan Irvine), for an assault on Kirkpatrick of Closeburn, as well as for slaying several other persons.

William Kirkpatrick who was descended from the Kirkpatrick of Conheath branch of the clan was a merchant in Málaga in Spain and he married the eldest daughter of a Belgian baron. His great-granddaughter was Eugénie de Montijo who became Empress of France when she married Napoleon III.

Castles

Closeburn Castle was main seat of the Kirkpatricks of Closeburn, chiefs of Clan Kirkpatrick.
Rockhall Tower was a castle that belonged to the Kirkpatricks.
Torthorwald Castle was another castle that belonged to the Kirkpatricks.
Tynron Doon is the site of a castle once held by the Kirkpatricks and Robert the Bruce is believed to have stayed there after murdering John Comyn.

See also
Armigerous clan
Colquhoun baronets
Kirkpatrick baronets

References

External links
Video footage and tales of the Closeburn churches.
Clan Colquhoun Society of the United Kingdom
Kirkpatrick & Kilpatrick Clans of N. America (Research & Sharing site)
CyberClan Kilpatrick
Kilpatricks in U.S. History
The Australian Kirkpatricks

Kirkpatrick
Kirkpatrick
History of Dumfriesshire
Scottish Lowlands